Alatyr may refer to:
 Alatyr (mythology), a rock in the middle of the world in Russian mythology
 Alatyr (river), a river in the Republic of Mordovia, Russia
 Alatyr, Chuvash Republic, a town in Russia
 Alatyr, Nizhny Novgorod Oblast, a village in Russia

See also
 Alatyr (inhabited locality), a list of inhabited localities in Russia
 Alatyrsky District